Deep Soul is a 2009 Greek drama film directed by Pantelis Voulgaris, on the 1946–49 Greek Civil War.

Plot
The story takes place during Greek Civil War. Two brothers from Greek countryside find themselves to fight with the two opposite sides. Both of them serve as guides for the mountainous paths of Western Macedonia, an area with many battlefields. Gradually the two boys are fanaticized and become crueler by war conditions. The film shows the hard condition of battlefields as well the impact of the war on the civilians.

Cast
Yorgos Angelkos as Vlasis / Comrade Flogas 	
Christos Karteris as Anestis	
Vangelis Mourikis as Captain Ntoulas
Giorgos Symeonidis as Second Lieutenant Triantafillos
Kostas Kleftogiannis as Taxiarhos
Victoria Haralabidou as Giannoula
Thanasis Veggos as the two brothers' grandfather

References

External links 

2009 drama films
2009 films
Works about the Greek Civil War
Greek drama films
2000s Greek-language films